The name Irving has been used for six tropical cyclones in the northwest Pacific Ocean.

 Typhoon Irving (1979) (T7910, 12W) – struck South Korea.
 Typhoon Irving (1982) (T8217, 18W, Ruping) – struck the southern tip of Luzon and China.
 Tropical Storm Irving (1985) (T8527, 26W) – approached southern Vietnam.
 Tropical Storm Irving (1989) (T8910, 10W) – struck northern Vietnam.
 Tropical Storm Irving (1992) (T9209, 09W) – struck Japan.
 Tropical Storm Irving (1995) (T9506, 09W, Diding) – struck China.

The name Irving has also been used once in the Australian region.
 Cyclone Irving (2018)

Pacific typhoon set index articles
Australian region cyclone set index articles